Raymond Richard Warren (23 June 1918 – 13 March 1988) was a professional footballer who spent his entire career at Bristol Rovers. He joined the club on 12 March 1936, at the age of 17, and spent twenty years playing as a centre-half with the Eastville club until retiring in 1956. On 26 March 2021, Warren became the fifth player to be inducted into the newly created Bristol Rovers Hall of Fame.

See also
One club men

References

1918 births
1988 deaths
Footballers from Bristol
English footballers
Association football defenders
English Football League players
Bristol Rovers F.C. players